Wang Chunchen (born 1964 in Zhangjiakou, Hebei province) is a Chinese curator, critic, and art historian. He has been described as "one of China's most distinguished curators, art critics and historians".

Education
Wang was educated at the Central Academy of Fine Arts in Beijing, China.

Career
Dr Wang is employed by the Central Academy of Fine Arts Art Museum, formerly the CAFA Art Museum, where he is Head of the Department of Curatorial Research. He is engaged in modern art history and contemporary art theory and criticism.

In 2012, Wang was hired as a special adjunct curator to curate Chinese contemporary art exhibitions by the Eli and Edythe Broad Art Museum at Michigan State University in the United States, the first Chinese curator to be so employed at an America art museum. In 2013, he was appointed as curator of the Chinese pavilion at the 55th International Art Exhibition – la Biennale di Venezia and deputy principal editor of the Journal of Contemporary Chinese Art in the United Kingdom. He is also the editor-in-chief of the Chinese Contemporary Art Series, published by Springer.

Books
Wang has written and translated the following books:

 Art Intervenes in Society (Timezone Publishing House, 2010)
 Artistic Democracy (China Youth Publishing House, 2013)
 The Politics of Images (China Youth Publishing House, 2013)
 Jizi and His Art in Contemporary China: Unification (with David Adam Brubaker, Springer, Chinese Contemporary Art Series, 2015)
 Future Returns: Contemporary Art from China (Art Media Resources, 2015)

Translations
 Art Since 1940 (Renmin University Press of China, 2006)
 Phenomena of Painting (Jiangsu Fine Arts Publishing House, 2006)
 New Thinking of Decoration (Jiangsu Fine Arts Publishing House, 2006)
 After the End of Art (Jiangsu People's Publishing House, 2007)
 The Abuse of Beauty (Jiangsu People's Publishing House, 2007)
 The Interpretation of Art ( Hunan Fine Arts Publishing House, 2008)
 The Language of Art History (Jiangsu Fine Arts Publishing House, 2008)
 Cai Guoqiang: I Want to Believe (People's Publishing House, 2008)
 Contemporary Art Theory Since 1985 ( Shanghai People's Fine Arts Publishing House, 2009)
 A Brief History of Art [Beauty] (Shanghai People's Fine Arts Publishing House, 2013)

Awards
Wang received the 2009 China Contemporary Art Award (CCAA) Critics Award. In 2011, he was funded by the Overseas Training Project of Chinese Young Artist Theorists to investigate the development status of art museums in the United States. In 2012, he was selected to participate in the Art Management Project co-organized by the British Council for Cultural Exchange and the Chinese Ministry of Culture, visiting the Royal College of Art and East Anglia University in the United Kingdom.

Selected curation

Wang has curated the following exhibitions in China and elsewhere:

2008
 Mixed Maze, London, United Kingdom
 Supernatural – China’s Photography in the New Century, New York, United States

2011
 CAFAM Biennale 2011: Super-Organism, CAFA Art Museum, Beijing

2012
 Conceptual Renewal: A Brief History of Chinese Contemporary Photography, Beijing

2013
 Transfiguration: The Presence of Chinese Artistic Methods, Venice Biennale, Venice, Italy

2014
 Future Returns: Contemporary Art from China, Broad Art Museum, Chicago, United States

2016
 Time Test-International Video Art Research Observation Exhibition, CAFA Art Museum, Beijing 
 Internal Combustion – A New Generation of Female Artists in China, Central Academy of Fine Arts Art Museum, Beijing
 Coincidence of Time – Spanish Artist Naranjo's Printmaking Exhibition, Central Academy of Fine Arts Art Museum, Beijing

2017
 Dating: Youth Art Exhibition from China and France, CAFA Art Museum, Beijing, China
 Ink Attack – The First Wuhan Ink and Wash Biennale, Wuhan Art Museum, Wuhan, China

2018
 Harmony-Buddhism and Art Exhibition, Putian Art Museum, Putian, Fujian
 Jizi: Journey of the Spirit, WhiteBox, New York, United States

2019
 The Gaze of History: Revisiting Contemporary Chinese Art, Jupiter Art Museum, Shenzhen
 Ink and Object: The Second Wuhan Ink and Wash Biennale, Wuhan Art Museum, Wuhan
 Anish Kapoor, first solo exhibition in China, Central Academy of Fine Arts Art Museum, Beijing 
 Photography in China 180 Years, exhibition of contemporary photography, Yinchuan Contemporary Art Museum, Yinchuan
 Jizi: Spiritual Journey, solo exhibition, Shijiazhuang Art Museum, Shijiazhuang
 Pop-up Biennale – Beijing Art District Studio History Document Exhibition, Nine Art District Art Museum, Beijing
 Huang Zhiyang: Hun Sheng Solo Exhibition, White Box Art Museum, Beijing 
 The Passion of Color: The Art of Tang Chenghua, Tianjin Binhai Art Museum, Tianjin
 The Logical Line of Painting – Invitation Exhibition of the Generation and Significance of Contemporary Painting, Jinji Lake Art Museum, Suzhou, China
 Marc Quinn – Under the Skin, Central Academy of Fine Arts Art Museum, Beijing

2020
 In Thought – The History and Methodology of Chinese Contemporary Art, Guangdong Museum of Art, Guangzhou

2021
 Liao Bangming: Hardcore Tackling the Tough, Baiyu Art Space, Beijing

References

External links
 Wang Chunchen on LinkedIn
 

1964 births
Living people
People from Zhangjiakou
Writers from Hebei
Writers from Beijing
Central Academy of Fine Arts alumni
Academic staff of the Central Academy of Fine Arts
Chinese art historians
Chinese art critics
Chinese art curators
People's Republic of China historians
People's Republic of China translators
Academic journal editors